Admiral The Honourable Sir Edward Alfred John Harris KCB (20 May 1808 – 17 July 1888) was a British naval commander, diplomat and politician.

Background
Harris was the second son of James Harris, 2nd Earl of Malmesbury, by Harriet Susan, daughter of Francis Bateman Dashwood. James Harris, 3rd Earl of Malmesbury, was his elder brother.

Career
Harris was an admiral in the Royal Navy. He also sat as Member of Parliament for Christchurch between 1844 and 1852 and served as Minister Plenipotentiary to the Swiss Confederation between 1858 and 1867 and as Envoy Extraordinary and Minister Plenipotentiary to the Netherlands between 1867 and 1877. He was appointed a Companion of the Order of the Bath in 1863 and a Knight Commander of the Order of the Bath in 1872. He was also a deputy lieutenant for Hampshire.

Family
Harris married Emma, the daughter of Captain Samuel Chambers and Susan Mathilda Wylly, in 1841. They had several children, including Edward Harris, 4th Earl of Malmesbury. He died in July 1888, aged 80. Lady Harris died in July 1896.

See also

References

External links

1808 births
1888 deaths
Younger sons of earls
Knights Commander of the Order of the Bath
Members of the Parliament of the United Kingdom for English constituencies
Royal Navy admirals
UK MPs 1841–1847
UK MPs 1847–1852
Deputy Lieutenants of Hampshire
Ambassadors of the United Kingdom to the Netherlands